Peter Palúch (born 17 February 1958) is a former Slovak football goalkeeper. He played for FC Nitra and took part on the Czechoslovak squad in the 1990 FIFA World Cup, in which he was the third option at goals for Jozef Vengloš, then manager of the Czechoslovaks. He did not earn any full international caps, but played in unofficial matches.

Career
Born in Ružomberok, Palúch began playing football with local side FC Plastika Nitra. He would spend much of his career in Austria, playing for Wiener Sport-Club and First Vienna FC.

References

1958 births
Living people
Association football goalkeepers
FC Nitra players
Wiener Sport-Club players
Slovak footballers
Slovak expatriate footballers
1990 FIFA World Cup players
Czechoslovak expatriate footballers
Czechoslovak footballers
Expatriate footballers in Austria
Czechoslovak expatriate sportspeople in Austria
Slovak expatriate sportspeople in Austria
Sportspeople from Ružomberok